Rajeev Bhau Appasaheb Rajale ( आमदार राजीव भाऊ राजळे ) (born 5 December 1969 in Kasar Pimpalgaon, Maharashtra, India) was an Indian politician. He wa
s an elected member of the Indian National Congress party in the Maharashtra State Assembly. He represented 231 Pathardi Shevgaon constituency.

Early life 
Rajale attended Pravara public school. Later, he attended the University of Pune and graduated with a Bachelor of Architecture.

Career
He joined politics in 1999 at the age of 30. Rajale began as a youth congress campaigner. He stood for election the same year, but lost. In 2004, he was elected to the State Assembly. He became popular among farmers and youth. He hosted many cultural programmes inviting the artists from various fields and honored them. He Contested Loksabha Elections in 2014 from Nationalist Congress Party

Death 
He died on 7 October 2017 after long term illness at age 48 in Mumbai.

Positions

References

External links

1969 births
Living people
Marathi politicians
Maharashtra MLAs 2004–2009
United Progressive Alliance candidates in the 2014 Indian general election
Indian National Congress politicians